Tareq Aziz (born 4 September 1983) is a former Bangladeshi international cricketer. He made his international debut for the Bangladesh cricket team in January 2002 against Pakistan

Career

Domestic cricket
He made his Twenty20 debut for Khulna Division in the  2010, National Cricket League Twenty20 on 15 April 2010

International cricket
Tareq Aziz made his Test debut for Bangladesh against West Indies on 1 June 2004

References

External links

1983 births
Living people
Bangladesh One Day International cricketers
Bangladesh Test cricketers
Bangladeshi cricketers
Chittagong Division cricketers
Khulna Division cricketers
People from Chittagong